Zborov is a village and municipality in Bardejov District in the Prešov Region of north-east Slovakia.

General
The village is located in northeastern Slovakia, 10 km from the Polish border. There are marked walking trails to Zborov Castle and the surrounding hills. The old unused two steepled church, in the center of the village is currently being rebuilt, the keys are kept in the tourist information centre just outside the gate, the manager (speaks English) can let you inside to climb the towers.  Farming, forestry and tourism are the major industries.

History
In historical records the village was first mentioned in 1355. The local Zborov Castle was built in the 16th century to protect the trade route from the east and encourage population of the surrounding region.

The village was the site of fighting in 1915 and suffered extensive damage during both the first and second world wars. During World War II the local Jewish population was deported to death camps.

Zborov is the birthplace of rabbi Yeshayah Steiner, founder of the Kerestir (Hasidic dynasty).

Geography
The municipality lies at an altitude of 325 metres and covers an area of 19.631 km2.
It has a population of about 2,865 people. The region is hilly and heavily forested. Two specially protected areas are nearby, one on the hill around the castle the other on the higher hills across the road.

Transport
Zborov lies on the Bardejov-Svidník road, with bus services to Bardejov (10 km away). A small road also leads north to Poland.

Gallery

See also
 Zborov Castle

References

External links
 
  
 https://web.archive.org/web/20071116010355/http://www.statistics.sk/mosmis/eng/run.html
 Article and gallery on WWI Military Cemetery in Zborov 

Villages and municipalities in Bardejov District
Šariš